The Lithuanian A Lyga 1997–98 was the eighth season of top-tier football in Lithuania. The season started on 9 August 1997 and ended on 17 June 1998. It was contested by 16 teams, and Kareda Šiauliai won the championship.

Final table

Results

References

LFF Lyga seasons
1997 in Lithuanian football
1998 in Lithuanian football
Lith